The Paxton House is a historic house in Brookhaven, Mississippi. It was built as a dogtrot house in 1831 by Benjamin Paxton, and extended in 1858. Paxton lived here with his wife, née Frances Lofton. He owned more than 1013 acres, and he died in 1872. The house was inherited by his descendants. It has been listed on the National Register of Historic Places since June 27, 1997.

References

Dogtrot architecture
Houses completed in 1831
National Register of Historic Places in Lincoln County, Mississippi
1831 establishments in Mississippi